William Michael Wilds (born 7 January 1946) is a British racing driver from England. He participated in eight Formula One World Championship Grands Prix, debuting on 20 July 1974.  He scored no championship points.

After winning a few races in Formula 3 in the early 1970s, Wilds moved on to Formula 5000. At the same time, he took part in a few Formula One Grands Prix, firstly with a non-works March, then with Ensign and BRM. After he failed to qualify at his home Grand Prix in 1976, with a privately run Shadow, he concentrated on other forms of motor sport, including sports car racing and historic racing.

In an interview with Wilds, published on YouTube, he described one of the highlights of his short-lived Formula One career, at the 1974 United States Grand Prix after qualifying, Tyrrell founder Ken Tyrrell walked up to him, telling Wilds that Jody Scheckter wanted to speak to him. Wilds had gone out in qualifying just ahead of Jody, assuming he was going too slow for the Tyrrell. Upon approaching Scheckter, Wilds thought he would be told he was slow. When the South African driver approached him, Wilds raised his voice to him, thinking he would be complained at. After this, Scheckter complemented Wilds' control and handling of the old Ensign N174.

Wilds won the Formula Two class in the 1978 Aurora AFX championship, driving a Ralt and finished ninth in the overall standings. He also won the Thoroughbred Sports Cars championship in 1984 driving an Aston Martin DB4.

Wilds won the RJB Mining Historic Sports Car Championship in 1992, '93, '96 and 98.

Wilds' sports car racing career included driving at Le Mans 8 times, including C2 cars for Ecurie Ecosse (World Champion C2, 1986), and Group C for Nissan in 1988 with team-mate Win Percy.

Wilds won the 2008 Britcar Drivers Championship together with Ian Lawson and Mike's son Anthony Wilds in the ING Sport BMW; the team also went on to win again in 2013 and also won the 2008 Group C Enduro Trophy in the Porsche 962 with Henry Pearman.

He still occasionally drives in events for historic cars. He raced a Porsche 962 and an Elva Mk5 in the 2008 Silverstone Classic. He returned to the Britcar Endurance grid in May 2016 posting his first win as a shared drive with son Anthony in a Ferrari 458.

At the age of 72 Wilds is set to make his debut in the Porsche Carrera Cup Great Britain series with the Redline Racing team at Brands Hatch.

In addition to his car racing career, Wilds is an active commercial helicopter pilot and instructor. He is affectionately known as 'The Honorific' Mike Wilds.

Racing record

Complete European F5000 Championship results
(key) (Races in bold indicate pole position; races in italics indicate fastest lap.)

Complete Formula One World Championship results
(key)

Complete Shellsport International Series results
(key) (Races in bold indicate pole position; races in italics indicate fastest lap.)

Complete British Formula One Championship results
(key) (Races in bold indicate pole position; races in italics indicate fastest lap.)

Complete British Saloon / Touring Car Championship results
(key) (Races in bold indicate pole position; races in italics indicate fastest lap.)

† Events with 2 races staged for the different classes.

‡ Endurance driver.

Complete World Sports-Prototype Championship results
(key) (Races in bold indicate pole position) (Races in italics indicate fastest lap)

Footnotes

Complete 24 Hours of Le Mans results

24 Hours of Silverstone results

Complete British GT Championship results
(key) (Races in bold indicate pole position) (Races in italics indicate fastest lap)

Complete Britcar results  
(key) (Races in bold indicate pole position in class – 1 point awarded just in first race) (Races in italics indicate fastest lap in class – 1 point awarded all races)

References

External links 
 Official site
 Mike Wilds driving F1 [HD]

English racing drivers
English Formula One drivers
Ensign Formula One drivers
People from Chiswick
BRM Formula One drivers
1946 births
Living people
24 Hours of Le Mans drivers
British Touring Car Championship drivers
British GT Championship drivers
Porsche Carrera Cup GB drivers
World Sportscar Championship drivers
British Formula One Championship drivers
Britcar drivers
Britcar 24-hour drivers
Nismo drivers
Ecurie Ecosse drivers